The Winnipeg River is a Canadian river that flows roughly northwest from Lake of the Woods in the province of Ontario to Lake Winnipeg in Manitoba. About  of the watershed is in northern Minnesota, United States.

The Winnipeg River watershed was the southeasternmost portion of the land granted in 1670 to the Hudson's Bay Company. The portion in Canada corresponds roughly to the land deeded to Canada in Treaty 3, signed in 1873 by Her Majesty's treaty commissioners and the First Nation chiefs at Northwest Angle on the Lake of the Woods. The river's name means "murky water" in Cree.

This river route was used by natives for thousands of years before European contact. French and English colonists also began to use the river in order to reach First Nations for the fur trade, with trade interactions for hundreds of years. It is the only major water route between what is now Ontario and southern Manitoba that was easily navigable by canoe. The Red River route was much farther south and had a longer portage. La Vérendrye was one of the first explorers to establish fur trade forts near the First Nations camps along the river.

The river section through Whiteshell Provincial Park has many petroforms near the Whiteshell River forks where the two rivers meet. These petroforms are an ancient reminder of the importance of the area for native travel, trade, ceremonies, harvesting, and settlements.

Geography 

Major modern communities along the banks of the Winnipeg River include Kenora, Minaki and Whitedog in Ontario; and Lac du Bonnet, Pinawa, Powerview, and Pine Falls, all in Manitoba. Whitedog is the home of the Wabaseemoong First Nation. The Sagkeeng First Nation is located near the mouth of the Winnipeg River and Pine Falls.

In Ontario, dams were built on the Winnipeg River at Kenora, exiting Lake of the Woods, and at Whitedog Falls. Power from the dams have supplied Kenora and a local pulp and paper mill, while local Anishinaabe populations have been negatively impacted by consequent environmental degradation. In Manitoba, there are six  hydroelectric dams: Pointe du Bois Generating Station at Pointe du Bois, Slave Falls a few kilometres downstream, Seven Sisters Generating Station at Seven Sisters Falls, MacArthur Falls Generating Station, Great Falls Generating Station, and Pine Falls Generating Station at Powerview, Manitoba.

Flows on the Winnipeg River are controlled through the various dams by the Lake of the Woods Control Board. It maintains a website with detailed descriptions of the river basin and water flow characteristics.

Tributaries
Major tributaries include the Black Sturgeon River, English River, Bird River, Lee River, Whiteshell River, Whitemouth River, and Macfarlane River.

Manitoba:

Spence Creek
Princes Creek
Pine Creek
Maskwa River
Little Bear River
Maple Creek
North Coca-Cola Creek
Sweet Creek
Coppermine Creek
Bird River
Rice Creek
Lee River
Whitemouth River
Big Creek
Caribou Creek
Picket Creek
Whiteshell River
Tie Creek
Lauries Creek
Walters Creek
Greer Lake Creek
Ryerson Creek
Bloms Creek
Crowduck Creek

Ontario:

Turtle Creek
Jadel Creek
Scot River
Sword Creek
English River
Whitedog River
Alice Creek
Dean Creek
Macfarlane River
Black Sturgeon River
Culloden Creek
War Eagle Creek

Lakes
Areas where the Winnipeg River widens markedly have been identified as lakes, including Gun, Roughrock and Sand lakes in Ontario; and Nutimik, Eleanor, Dorothy, Margaret, Natalie, and Lac du Bonnet, all in Manitoba. Nutimik, Dorothy, and Margaret lakes are all entirely within the Whiteshell Provincial Park.

Lake of the Woods (source)
Middle Lake, Ontario (Kenora)
Gun Lake, Ontario
Pistol Lake
Little Sand Lake
Big Sand Lake
Roughrock Lake
Swan Lake, Ontario (Kenora)
Tetu Lake
Numao Lake
Nutimik Lake
Margaret Lake, Manitoba
Dorothy Lake
Eleanor Lake
Sylvia Lake, Manitoba
Natalie Lake (lake)
Lac du Bonnet (lake)
Lake Winnipeg (mouth)

Exploration and fur trade

The Winnipeg River was the main route from the Great Lakes to Western Canada before the railroads were constructed in this area. After reaching Lake Winnipeg, a traveler could go by canoe as far as the Rocky Mountains, Arctic Ocean or Hudson Bay. This section covers the route from Lake Superior to Lake Winnipeg via Rainy Lake, the Rainy River, Lake of the Woods and the Winnipeg River. For the route in general, see Nelson River basin.

The area was too rocky to be good beaver country, as they needed a forested habitat. Grand Portage was the second-longest portage in Canada after Methye Portage. Once over the height of land, rivers led west to Rainy Lake and the Rainy River. Duncan M'Gillivray called the Rainy the 'most beautiful river in the north'. George Simpson and many others made similar comments.

The route went up the east side of Lake of the Woods and over the Rat Portage (Kenora) to the Winnipeg. The Winnipeg River was notorious for its many portages and décharges. Three were known as the Dales, Portage de l'Isle, and La Rivière Blanche, named for its white water. This last was the scene of many deaths. Its seven portages were all visible from the same spot. After the last portage, at Manitou Rapids, the river opened out into the Bas de la Rivière and then the lake. About halfway up the river, the English River led to Fort Albany on James Bay.

In 1679 Daniel Greysolon, Sieur du Lhut, reached the western tip of Lake Superior. In 1688 Jacques de Noyon went from Kaministiquia as far as Rainy Lake and perhaps beyond. He seems to have been followed by coureurs des bois, who may have gotten as far as Lake Winnipeg. They left no records, but the English on Hudson Bay heard reports of the coureurs in 1718 if not earlier. In 1717 Zacharie Robutel de La Noue tried and failed to penetrate the area.

Opening of the land west of Lake Superior by a European is credited to La Vérendrye in 1731–1743. In 1731 his men built a post on Rainy Lake. In 1732 he built Fort Saint Charles on Lake of the Woods. In 1733 one of his sons almost reached Lake Winnipeg but was blocked by ice. In 1734 two explorers reported that they had reached the south end of Lake Winnipeg, and La Vérendrye ordered the first Fort Maurepas to be built there soon after. By 1743 the French had reached the Assiniboine and Saskatchewan rivers and had sent explorers to present-day North Dakota and, probably, Wyoming in what is now the United States.

All this drew trade away from the Hudson's Bay Company. After the British conquest of Canada as part of its victory in the Seven Years' War, French traders were largely replaced by "pedlars" (as the HBC people called them) from Montreal. The pedlars soon formed the North West Company, which was capitalized by both English and Scots. From about 1775 the HBC began building competing posts in the interior, including one on the Rainy River. Competition ended in 1821 when the two companies merged and trade was diverted to York Factory on Hudson Bay. Trade was also diverted south as population grew on the United States side. The last major use of the route was by the Wolseley Expedition in 1870. After 1885 the Canadian Pacific Railway connected eastern and western Canada with a route north of Lake Superior.

Trading posts on the route were:
Lake Superior: 1.Fort Kaministiquia (1717), later called Fort William, Ontario (NWC, 1803)  and 2. Grand Portage with Fort Charlotte;
Rainy River: Fort Saint Pierre (1731), Fort Lac la Pluie (NWC, circa 1780), Asp House (HBC 1794), Hungry Hall (HBC 1825);
Lake of the Woods: Fort Saint Charles (1732);
Winnipeg River Mouth:Fort Maurepas (Canada) (c 1739), Fort Bas de la Rivière (NWC, 1792), Fort Alexander (HBC, before 1800)

See also
La Vérendrye Trail
List of longest rivers of Canada
List of rivers of Ontario
List of rivers of Manitoba

References

Further reading 

 Luby, Brittany. Dammed: The Politics of Loss and Survival in Anishinaabe Territory. University of Manitoba Press, 2020. ISBN 978-0-88755-874-0
Morton, Arthur Silver. A History of the Canadian West to 1870-71: Being a History of Rupert's Land (the Hudson's Bay Company's Territory) and of the North-West Territory (including the Pacific Slope). Edited by Lewis Gwynne Thomas. University of Toronto Press, in co-operation with the University of Saskatchewan, 1973. ISBN 9780802040336

External links 

Rivers of Manitoba
Rivers of Kenora District
Tributaries of Hudson Bay
Bodies of water of Eastman Region, Manitoba